Ira Alterman (4 July 1945 – 6 July 2015) was an American journalist and author, particularly of illustrated novelty books.

Ira Alterman was born on 4 July 1945.

Alterman wrote for Boston After Dark, which later became The Boston Phoenix.

He was married to Carolyn Windle, and they had two children, Daniel and Sara. Sara would later become an author and helped Alterman write his final books following an Alzheimer's diagnosis.

Ira Alterman died on 6 July 2015.

Selected publications
Games You Can Play with Your Pussy
Picking Up Girls
Computer Weak
The Official Irish Sex Manual
Computing for Profits
Dog Child - The Big Dog Book
The Naughty Bride
So, You've Got a Fat Pussy
Do Diapers Give You Leprosy? What Every Parent Should Know About Bringing Up Babies
Sex Manual for People over Thirty
Gourmet Dinners for the Canine Connoisseur
Games for the John
The Wedding Night
How To Pick Up Men
How To Pick Up Girls
So, You've Got a Fat Pussy!
Baby's First Year
Games You Can't Lose
Games You Can't Win
Our Aim Is To Keep This Bathroom Clean: Your Aim Will Help
Official Pro Football Handbook
You Little Stinker
Life's A Picnic If You Have A Big Weenie

References
 

1945 births
2015 deaths
American journalists
American non-fiction writers
People from Boston